Diavik Airport  is a private aerodrome in the Northwest Territories, Canada that serves the Diavik Diamond Mine. It is situated in a busy area due to the closeness of Ekati Airport. Prior permission is required to land except in the case of an emergency.

References

External links
Page about this airport on COPA's Places to Fly airport directory

Registered aerodromes in the North Slave Region